The Kenya Forest Service is an agency of the Government of Kenya designated by the Forest Act of 2005 as the replacement for the old Forest Department. It is overseen by the Board of the Kenya Forest Service. The former Forest Department was supported almost entirely from forest revenues, and was, as a result, chronically underfunded. Under the 2005 Forest Act this has changed somewhat, with for example, the creation of special funds such as the Water Towers Conservation Fund, a portion of which goes to forest rehabilitation, and the Mau Rehabilitation Trust Fund, for the Mau Forest. , Kenya had 1.57 million hectares of gazetted forest.

Mission

Among the responsibilities of the Kenya Forest Service are to:
 Own, manage and protect all state forests
 Promote forestry education and training and operate the Kenya Forestry College
 Enforce the conditions and regulations pertaining to logging, charcoal making and other forest utilisation activities
 Apprehend and prosecute violators of forest law and regulations
 Collect revenues from exploitation of forest products

Forest management plans 

The Kenya Forest Service has begun issuing management plans for individual forests. Plans are in effect for:
 Arabuko-Sokoke Forest
 Cherangani Hills Forest consisting of thirteen blocks including the Embobut Forest
 Karura Forest
 Kereita Forest
 Mau Forest
 Saboti-Sosio Forest, a Green Zones Development Support Project supported plan
 South Nandi Forest, a Green Zones Development Support Project and Nature Kenya supported plan
 Vanga, Jimbo and Kiwegu Mangrove Forest, an Air Kenya supported plan

Notes

External links
 
 https://twitter.com/KeForestService

Forest
Forestry agencies
Organisations based in Nairobi
2005 establishments in Kenya
Forestry in Kenya